John Maximilian Dolphin (16 September 1837 – 3 February 1899) was an English first-class cricketer and clergyman.

The son of John Dolphin senior, he was born in September 1837 at Southrepps, Norfolk. He was educated at Marlborough College, before going up to Oriel College, Oxford. While studying at Oxford, he made two appearances in first-class cricket for Oxford University in 1860, against the Marylebone Cricket Club at Oxford and Cambridge University in The University Match at Lord's. After graduating from Oxford, Dolphin took holy orders in the Church of England in 1860. His first ecclesiastical posting was as vicar of Coddington, Nottinghamshire in 1868, with him becoming the rural dean there in 1886. He left his post at Coddington to become the vicar of Long Eaton in 1890. Dolphin died at Newark-on-Trent in February 1899.

References

External links

1837 births
1899 deaths
People from North Norfolk (district)
People educated at Marlborough College
Alumni of Oriel College, Oxford
English cricketers
Oxford University cricketers
19th-century English Anglican priests